The Samsung Gravity (SGH-t459) is a slider feature phone with a full QWERTY keypad.  It was first released for T-Mobile USA.  The Samsung SGH-t349 is a mobile phone available through T-Mobile and announced on May 20, 2009 that has many similarities to the original Gravity.

Features

Although the Gravity's main feature is its QWERTY keyboard, there are other capabilities included with it.

Applications and games
From T-Zones, one can download Java applications that run on mobile phones and store them in the phone.

Music player
Supports MP3 file formats, and can be added via Universal Serial Bus (USB), MicroSD, or Bluetooth. It is also possible to listen to music with a wireless Bluetooth headset.  Songs can be set as a ringtone or alarm tone.

Camera
The Samsung Gravity has a basic 1.3-megapixel camera with digital zoom, multi-shot, and camcorder capabilities. Photos can be set as wallpaper or Caller ID.

Availability
In the United States, this phone was released on T-Mobile USA.
In Canada, the Gravity 2 was previously available first on Rogers Wireless, then later on its Chatr brand.  Both carriers have discontinued the device in 2011.  They now carry other QWERTY feature phones instead.

See also 
Samsung Blast (SGH-T729)
Samsung Behold

External links 
 http://www.phonearena.com/htmls/Samsung-Gravity-phone-p_3209.html
 http://www.phonearena.com/htmls/Samsung-SGH-T349-phone-p_3600.html
 http://www.t-mobile.com/shop/phones/Cell-Phone-Detail.aspx?cell-phone=t349

Samsung mobile phones
Mobile phones introduced in 2008
Mobile phones introduced in 2009
Slider phones